Darcy Graham (born 21 June 1997) is a Scottish rugby union player who plays for Edinburgh as a winger or fullback.

Rugby union career

Amateur career 
Graham played for Hawick Rugby Club, playing in the Scottish Cup final aged only 17.

Professional career 
Having been a Scottish Rugby Academy stage 2 player, in 2017 Graham was signed by Edinburgh on a two year professional contract.

He made his debut in the European Challenge Cup against London Irish, scoring a try in a 50-20 win.

International career 
He has represented Scotland under 18s, Scotland under 20s and Scotland 7s. In August 2017 Gregor Townsend called Graham up to the extended Scotland national team training squad.

In October 2018 Graham was called up again to the training squad and was then promoted to the main squad. He earned his first cap off the bench against Wales in November 2018. His first international try came in the 2019 Six Nations match against Wales at Murrayfield, and he subsequently scored two tries against England in the Calcutta Cup.

Graham was part of Scotland's squad for the 2019 Rugby World Cup in Japan.

International statistics

International tries

References

1997 births
Living people
Edinburgh Rugby players
Hawick RFC players
Rugby union players from Hawick
Rugby union wings
Scotland international rugby union players
Scottish rugby union players